Izaac Yohanes Wanggai (born 19 May 1982) is an Indonesian former footballer who plays as a defensive midfielder for and captains Liga 2 club Persewar Waropen.

His younger brother, Patrich Wanggai, and his cousin, Imanuel Wanggai, is also a football player.

Honours

Club
Persipura Jayapura
 Indonesia Soccer Championship A: 2016

References

External links
 Izaac Wanggai at Liga Indonesia
 Izaac Wanggai at Soccerway

1982 births
Living people
People from Nabire Regency
Indonesian footballers
Perseman Manokwari players
Persidafon Dafonsoro players
Persipura Jayapura players
Persebaya Surabaya players
Persewar Waropen players
Indonesian Premier Division players
Liga 1 (Indonesia) players
Liga 2 (Indonesia) players
Association football midfielders
Sportspeople from Papua